Mahmud Kâmil Pasha (1880 – June 1922) was a general of the Ottoman Army. He was born in Heleb (Aleppo) and died in Istanbul.

Career 
On 22 December 1914, he was appointed as the commander of the Second Army. On 17 February 1915, he was appointed as the commander of the 3rd Army in the eastern Anatolia, later assigned to 5th Army

He commanded the 3rd Army until the fall of the key fortress of Erzurum in February 1916, after which he was relieved of command.  After the armistice of Mudros the allied administration established with the occupation of Constantinople arrested him and become one of the Malta exiles.

References

1880 births
1922 deaths
People from Aleppo
Ottoman Military Academy alumni
Ottoman Military College alumni
Ottoman military personnel of the Balkan Wars
Ottoman Army generals
Pashas
Ottoman military personnel of World War I
Exiles from the Ottoman Empire
Malta exiles